Spiral waves are travelling waves that rotate outward from a center in a spiral. They are a feature of many excitable media. Spiral waves have been observed in various biological systems including systems such as heart ventricular fibrillation, retinal spreading depression, Xenopus oocyte calcium waves, and glial calcium waves in cortical tissue culture.

References

Nonlinear systems
Pattern formation
Articles containing video clips